The Kord-12.7 mm heavy machine gun is a Russian design that entered service in 1998 replacing the older NSV machine gun. Externally the weapon resembles the NSV; however, the internal mechanism has been extensively reworked, changing from a horizontally pivoting breech block to a rotating bolt design. Additionally the gas system has been changed and the muzzle baffle redesigned. These changes give the weapon reduced recoil compared with the NSV, allowing greater accuracy during sustained fire.

Development 
The catalyst for the development of the weapon was a complete lack of any heavy machine guns in construction at that time in the Russian Federation. Prior to the dissolution of the Soviet Union, the weapon that had functioned as the heavy machine gun was the NSV, or "Utes" or "Utjos" ("утёс", meaning one lonely cliff in Russian, this name was its designation during development) machine gun. The main production centre for the NSV was located in what is now Kazakhstan.

The Russian Degtyarev bureau was given the job of producing an updated version of the weapon chambered in the 12.7×108mm cartridge, which could be used for support, mounted on vehicles or in an anti-aircraft capacity. All variants of the weapon are also available chambered in the .50 BMG (12.7×99mm NATO) cartridge for export sales.

The weapon employs new construction, and consequently is significantly lighter than its predecessor. The firing mechanism is very rugged, and is capable of a greater rate of fire and significantly less recoil. Because a new barrel made of a high-tech alloy minimizes distortion and drop, accuracy has increased tremendously over previous Soviet machine guns. Unlike its predecessor, it may be fired from a bipod; a rather unusual feature for 12.7 mm/.50 caliber heavy machine guns.  Its relatively light weight and lesser recoil allows stronger soldiers to move the gun around without assistance.

Variants
 6P49: Baseline variant for vehicle mounting.
 6P50: Basic infantry version.
 6P50-1 (6P57): 6T19 Bipod-mounted infantry version. Bipod provides ±15° range of traverse.
 6P50-2 (6P58): Infantry variant.
 6P50-3 (6P59): Mounted on boats, sea-going ships, and stationary objects on a 6U16 multipurpose mount. Casing ejection is to the right side.
 6P51: Co-axial version with left-hand feed system and forward casing ejection.

Remote weapon stations
 6C21 is a Russian remote weapon station using Kord machine gun or PKMT machine gun.

Combat history 
The Kord machine gun was used by the Russian forces in 1999–2000 during the Second Chechen war and in 2008 during the Russo-Georgian War. It later saw action in the Russo-Ukrainian War and in the Syrian Civil War. 6P67, 6P68, 6P69 versions entered service in 2019.

Users

 : for purposes of NSV replacement testing.
 
 
 
 : on T-90S tank

See also
 List of Russian weaponry

References

External links

 V.A. Degtyarev Plant – official site
 Modern Firearms
 Image of Kord on Tripod
 «KORD» large caliber machine gun

12.7×108 mm machine guns
.50 BMG machine guns
Degtyarev Plant products
Gas-operated firearms
Heavy machine guns of Russia
Post–Cold War weapons of Russia
Weapons and ammunition introduced in 1998